The first season of Cobra Kai was released on YouTube Red on May 2, 2018 and consisted of 10 episodes. The series is a direct sequel to the original four films in The Karate Kid franchise, focusing on the characters of Daniel LaRusso and Johnny Lawrence over 30 years after the original film.

There were six starring roles throughout the season which also featured guest actors returning to the franchise portraying characters from the films. The season received universal acclaim for the performances (particularly those of Macchio, Zabka, and Maridueña), action sequences, and faithfulness to the original films.

Cast and characters

Main 
 Ralph Macchio as Daniel LaRusso
 William Zabka as Johnny Lawrence
 Courtney Henggeler as Amanda LaRusso
 Xolo Maridueña as Miguel Diaz
 Tanner Buchanan as Robby Keene
 Mary Mouser as Samantha LaRusso

Recurring 
 Jacob Bertrand as Eli "Hawk" Moskowitz
 Gianni DeCenzo as Demetri Alexopoulos
 Ed Asner as Sid Weinberg
 Nichole Brown as Aisha Robinson
 Hannah Kepple as Moon
 Vanessa Rubio as Carmen Diaz
 Rose Bianco as Rosa Diaz
 Diora Baird as Shannon Keene
 Bret Ernst as Louie LaRusso Jr.
 Dan Ahdoot as Anoush
 Joe Seo as Kyler Park
 Annalisa Cochrane as Yasmine
 Griffin Santopietro as Anthony LaRusso
 Bo Mitchell as Brucks
 Owen Morgan as Bert
 Susan Gallagher as Homeless Lynn 
 Terayle Hill as Trey
 Jeff Kaplan as Cruz

Notable guests 
 David Shatraw as Tom Cole
 Ken Davitian as Armand Zarkarian
 Randee Heller as Lucille LaRusso
 Martin Kove as John Kreese

Episodes

Reception 
The first season had a positive response from critics. At the review aggregator website Rotten Tomatoes, it holds a 100% approval rating, with an average score of 7.54 out of 10 based on 48 reviews. The website's critical consensus reads: "Cobra Kai continues the Karate Kid franchise with a blend of pleasantly corny nostalgia and teen angst, elevated by a cast of well-written characters". Cobra Kai was 2018's best-reviewed TV drama on Rotten Tomatoes. Metacritic, which uses a weighted average, assigned the season a score of 72 out of 100 based on 18 critics, indicating "generally favorable reviews".

The first episode, which was posted on YouTube for free along with episode two, had been viewed 5.4 million times within the first 24 hours. While it was noted that the response had been, in part, a result of YouTube releasing the episode for free, it was noted by Cinema Blends Britt Lawrence that "YouTube Red's new series debuted to numbers that should make rival streaming services take notice".

Production

Development 
Cobra Kai was greenlit in August 2017, with ten half-hour episodes, written and executive produced by Josh Heald, Jon Hurwitz, and Hayden Schlossberg. Although the series received offers from Netflix, Amazon, Hulu, and AMC, it ultimately ended up on the subscription service YouTube Red. The trio was joined by executive producers James Lassiter and Caleeb Pinkett of Overbrook Entertainment in association with Sony Pictures Television. YouTube Premium released the first season on May 2, 2018.

Casting 
Ralph Macchio and William Zabka revived their Karate Kid characters, Daniel LaRusso and Johnny Lawrence. Additional Karate Kid actors included Randee Heller, who reprised her role as Lucille LaRusso (Daniel's mother), and Martin Kove, who revived his role as John Kreese.  The cast for the first season was announced in October 2017, and included Xolo Maridueña, Mary Mouser, Tanner Buchanan, and Courtney Henggeler. Ed Asner was cast in a guest role as Johnny's verbally abusive step-father, Sid Weinberg. Vanessa Rubio joined the cast as Miguel's mother in December.

Filming 
Principal photography for the first season began in October 2017 in Atlanta, Georgia. Filming took place at various locations throughout that month at places including Union City, Marietta, and the Briarcliff Campus of Emory University. In November, shooting moved to locales such as the North Atlanta Soccer Association Tophat fields in East Cobb. In December, the production was working out of Marietta and Conyers. Various exterior shots were also filmed in parts of Los Angeles such as Tarzana and Encino. Exterior locations included Golf N' Stuff in Norwalk and the South Seas Apartments in Reseda, both of which were originally featured in The Karate Kid.

Premiere 
The season held its world premiere on April 24, 2018, at the SVA Theatre in New York City, New York, during the annual Tribeca Film Festival. Following the screening, a discussion was held with writers, directors, and executive producers Hayden Schlossberg, Jon Hurwitz, and Josh Heald, in addition to series stars and co-executive producers William Zabka and Ralph Macchio.

On April 25, YouTube partnered with Fathom Events for special screenings of the first two episodes of the season at around 700 movie theaters across the United States. The event also included a screening of the original film.

Soundtrack 

Madison Gate Records released the official soundtrack on May 4, 2018. La-La Land Records released the physical version of the soundtrack with additional tracks in June. The soundtrack CD was released in Australia on January 8, 2019.

Track listing

References 

2018 American television seasons
Cobra Kai